Palaina lucia, also known as Lucy's staircase snail, is a species of staircase snail that is endemic to Australia's Lord Howe Island in the Tasman Sea.

Description
The globose pupiform shell of adult snails is 3.2–3.5 mm in height, with a diameter of 1.9–2 mm. It is reddfish-brown in colour, with a white peripheral band on the final whorl, white radial streak above the aperture, and deeply impressed sutures. It has strong, widely spaced, axal ribs. The umbilicus is closed. The circular aperture has a strongly reflected lip and an operculum is present.

Habitat
The snail is found on the upper slopes and summits of the southern mountains.

References

 
lucia
Gastropods of Lord Howe Island
Taxa named by Tom Iredale
Gastropods described in 1944